Seviyan may refer to:
 Seviyan, Azerbaijan
 Seviyan (food)